Reports of Cases in the High Court of Chancery, 13 and 14 Geo. II. from April 25, 1740, to May 9, 1741 is the title of a collection of nominate reports, by Thomas Barnardiston, of cases decided by the Court of Chancery, between approximately 1740 and 1741. For the purpose of citation, their name may be abbreviated to "Barn C". They are reprinted in volume 27 of the English Reports.

In 1847, J. G. Marvin said:

References
Barnardiston, T. Reports of Cases in the High Court of Chancery, 13 and 14 Geo. II. from April 25, 1740, to May 9, 1741. folio. London. 1742.
Wallace. The Reporters. 424.

Sets of reports reprinted in the English Reports
Court of Chancery